The Corning Royals were a minor league baseball team located in Corning, New York. The team played in the New York–Penn League. Their home stadium was Corning Memorial Stadium.

In contrast to most other New York–Penn teams, the Corning franchise never developed its own brand or identity, always naming itself after its parent club; even in the one year the team had no major league affiliation, instead of establishing a name for itself, it simply referred to itself as the Independents.

History
The team was first founded in 1951 as the Corning Athletics or Corning A's as an affiliate of the Philadelphia Athletics. In 1953 the team had no major league affiliation and was called the Corning Independents. However the team began and affiliation with the Boston Red Sox and were known as the Corning Red Sox each year until 1960, with the exception of 1959, when they were named the Corning Cor-Sox.

The team then went inactive until 1968 when the city became an affiliate of the expansion Kansas City Royals, and was named the Corning Royals before folding again in 1969.

Notable alumni

 Galen Cisco (1958)

 Ken McBride (1955) 3 x MLB All-Star

Bill Monbouquette (1955-1956) 4 x MLB All-Star

 Paul Splittorff (1968) MLB All-Star

 Glenn Wright (1955, MGR)

Baseball teams established in 1951
Sports clubs disestablished in 1969
Defunct New York–Penn League teams
Defunct baseball teams in New York (state)
Boston Red Sox minor league affiliates
Philadelphia Athletics minor league affiliates
Kansas City Royals minor league affiliates
1969 disestablishments in New York (state)
1951 establishments in New York (state)
Baseball teams disestablished in 1969
Corning, New York